Suad Amiry (born 1951) is an author and architect living in the West Bank city of Ramallah.

Education
She studied architecture at the American University of Beirut, the University of Michigan, and the University of Edinburgh, Scotland. Her parents went from Palestine to Amman, Jordan. She was brought up there and went to Lebanon's capital of Beirut to study architecture.

Personal life
When she returned to Ramallah as a tourist in 1981, she met Salim Tamari, whom she married later, and stayed.

Career
Her book Sharon and My Mother-in-Law has been translated into 19 languages, the last one in Arabic, which was a bestseller in France, and was awarded in 2004 the prestigious Viareggio Prize in Italy together with Italo-Israeli Manuela Dviri, a journalist, playwright, and writer whose son was killed by a Hezbollah rocket during a confrontation while he was serving in the Israeli Army.

From 1991 to 1993 Amiry was a member of a Palestinian peace delegation in Washington, D.C. She is engaged in some major peace initiatives of Palestinian and Israeli women.

From 1994 to 1996 she was the Assistant Deputy Minister and Director General of the Palestinian Authority's Ministry of Culture.

She is Director and founder of the Riwaq Centre for Architectural Conservation, the center was founded in 1991; the first of its kind to work on the rehabilitation and protection of architectural heritage in Palestine.

Amiry was a member of staff at Birzeit University until 1991, since then she has worked for Riwaq where she is the director. She was appointed as a vice-chairperson of the Board of Trustees of Birzeit University  in 2006.

Riwaq
One of Riwaq's first projects was the compilation of a registry of buildings of significant historical value in Palestine. Completed in 2004, it listed 50,000 buildings, around half of which were abandoned.
In 2001 Riwaq launched a ten year program of job creation through conservation (tashgheel). Workers were trained in the use of traditional materials and techniques.
In 2005 they launched the 50 villages project restoring public spaces and involving villagers in renovating their own properties.
Riwaq has also done important work on the so-called "throne villages" (qura al-karasi), the centres of Ottoman tax districts.

Books
 Space, Kinship and Gender: The Social Dimension of Peasant Architecture in Palestine. University of Edinburgh Press (1987)
 The Palestinian Village Home. British Museum Press. (1989) with Vera Tamari
 Traditional Floor Tiles in Palestine. Riwaq monograph. (2000)
 Earthquake in April. Institute of Palestine Studies. (2003)
 Sharon and My Mother-in-Law : Ramallah Diaries. Knopf Doubleday Publishing Group (2005)
 Nothing to Lose but Your Life: An 18-Hour Journey with Murad. (Paperback) Bloomsbury Qatar Foundation Publishing (2010)
 Menopausal Palestine: Women at the Edge. Women Unlimited. (2010)
 Golda Slept Here. Hamad Bin Khalifa University Press. (2014)
 My Damascus. Olive Branch Press. (2021 - Italian edition 2017)

References

External links
Riwaq Centre for Architectural Conservation
Birzeit University
 Radio Interview - Recording from BBC Radio 4's Woman's Hour
 Visit to the Palestine Center (Washington DC) for a talk and book signing. Read the transcript online or watch the video of her talk

1951 births
Living people
People from Ramallah
Academic staff of Birzeit University
Palestinian memoirists
American University of Beirut alumni
Alumni of the University of Edinburgh
Women architects
Palestinian architects
Taubman College of Architecture and Urban Planning alumni
Palestinian women architects
Women memoirists
Palestine ethnographers